The Leak is the first extended play (EP) by American rapper Lil Wayne. It was released on December 25, 2007, under Cash Money Records and Universal Motown Records. The five songs on the EP were recorded by Lil Wayne during Tha Carter III sessions. The songs were ultimately leaked online by an unknown source, Wayne later compiled the songs and called the project The Leak. Lil Wayne decided to put out The Leak for his fans, so that they could have CD-quality versions of the songs. The EP was later used as a bonus disc for the deluxe edition of Tha Carter III (2008).

Track listing

References 

2007 debut EPs
Cash Money Records EPs
Lil Wayne albums